Zena Sutherland (1915 – June 12, 2002) was an American reviewer of children's literature.  She is best known for her contributions to the Bulletin of the Center for Children's Books and as the author of the library science textbook Children and Books.

Early life and education
Sutherland was born in Winthrop, Massachusetts in 1915 but was raised in Chicago by her mother after her parents’ divorce. She graduated from the University of Chicago in 1937. In 1966, she received her master's, also from the University of Chicago, in library science.

Career
She edited the Bulletin of the Center for Children's Books for almost 30 years. From 1966 until 1972, Sutherland also wrote a monthly column for the Saturday Review called Books for Young People before becoming the children's books editor for the Chicago Tribune between 1972 and 1984. As well as reviewing children's books, she worked at the University of Chicago Graduate Library School between 1972 and 1986 where she taught two classes, "Children's Literature" and "Literature for Young Adults". During her 40-year career of reviewing children's literature, Sutherland wrote 19 books and reviewed over 30,000 children's books.

Sutherland also authored the textbook Children and Books.  Several editions were co-authored by Sutherland and May Hill Arbuthnot. Sutherland wrote five additional editions, the last of which was published in 1996, after Arbuthnot's death in 1969.

Two of her former students established the Zena Sutherland Lecture Series in 1983 in her honor. In 1995, the Zena Sutherland Awards for Excellence in Children's Literature was established by Philip Matsikas, Donna Schatt and Karen Putman. She was awarded the Norman Maclean Faculty Award 1998 in recognition of her teaching career.

Personal life
Sutherland married Roland Bailey in 1937 and they had three children, Stephen, Thomas and Katherine. They later  divorced. She was married to her second husband, Alec Sutherland, from 1964 until his death in 1996. On June 12, 2002, Sutherland died of cancer while in hospital in Chicago.

References

External links 
 Sutherland, Zena Bailey. Papers at the University of Chicago Special Collections Research Center

1915 births
2002 deaths
University of Chicago alumni
American literary critics
Women literary critics
People from Winthrop, Massachusetts
20th-century American women writers
20th-century American journalists
American women non-fiction writers
American women critics